is a Japanese manga series written and illustrated by .

Reception

A. E. Sparrow, writing for IGN, described Imperfect Hero as being a parody of the Super Sentai genre. Ed Chavez, writing for Mania.com, described the plot as being like a sitcom.

References

Further reading

External links 
 

2003 manga
Comedy anime and manga
Gentosha manga
Seinen manga